Ahmet Karademir (born 2 April 2004) is a Turkish football player who plays as a winger for Konyaspor in the Süper Lig.

Professional career
A youth product of Karakartallarspor, 1922 Konyaspor and Konyaspor, Karademir signed his first professional contract with Konyaspor on on 11 September 2020. At the age of 16, Karademir made his professional debut with [onyaspor in a 2-0 Süper Lig win over BB Erzurumspor on 5 December 2020.

International career
Karademir is a youth international for Turkey, having represented the Turkey U14s, U15s, and U16s.

References

External links
 
 

2004 births
Living people
People from Selçuklu
Turkish footballers
Turkey youth international footballers
Kayserispor footballers
Süper Lig players
Association football wingers
Mohammad Nemati